Madison College was a small college for men, founded in 1851 in Sharon, Mississippi.  It ceased operations for financial reasons in 1872.

The establishment of the college was proposed 1850 in a speech given at Sharon Female College by Thomas C. Thornton, then president of the nearby Brandon College in Brandon, Mississippi.  He offered to transfer the charter and assets of Brandon College to the town of Sharon on the condition that a building for the new school, to be named Madison College, be provided. Thornton was the first president, as well as "professor of moral and intellectual science and sacred literature."  Madison College offered the following degrees: A. B., A. M., D. D., and LL D.

The college suspended operations during the civil war.  It reopened after the war but closed in 1872, "perishing for want of endowment and patronage."

Notable faculty and alumni
 Patrick Henry — U. S. Congressman.

References

Defunct private universities and colleges in Mississippi
Education in Madison County, Mississippi
Educational institutions established in 1851
Educational institutions disestablished in 1872
1851 establishments in Mississippi